is a Japanese manga series written and illustrated by Taiyō Matsumoto. It was serialized in Shogakukan's seinen manga magazine Weekly Big Comic Spirits from 1991 to 1992.

Publication
Written and illustrated by Taiyō Matsumoto, Hanaotoko was serialized in Shogakukan's seinen manga magazine Weekly Big Comic Spirits from 1991 to 1992. Shogakukan collected its chapters in three tankōbon volumes, released from March 30 to August 29, 1992. Shogakukan re-released the series in three wideban on October 30, 1998. The series was re-released in a three-in-one volume on July 30, 2018.

The manga was licensed in France by Kana.

References

Further reading

External links

Baseball in anime and manga
Seinen manga
Shogakukan manga
Slice of life anime and manga